Monopetalotaxis is a genus of moths in the family Sesiidae.

Species
Monopetalotaxis candescens (Felder, 1874)
Monopetalotaxis chalciphora  (Hampson, 1919)
Monopetalotaxis doleriformis (Walker, 1856)
Monopetalotaxis luteopunctata (de Freina, 2011)
Monopetalotaxis pyrocraspis (Hampson, 1910)

References

Sesiidae